Mermaid Avenue: The Complete Sessions is a 2012 box set of albums by Billy Bragg & Wilco, all of which feature songs consisting of previously unheard lyrics written by American folk singer-songwriter Woody Guthrie set to newly created music. It was released by Nonesuch Records on Record Store Day to commemorate Guthrie's 100th birthday.

The set contains all of the tracks from the previously released Mermaid Avenue (1998) and Mermaid Avenue Vol. II (2000), as well as a third disc of outtakes from the original album sessions in 1997 and 1998. A DVD containing the documentary Man in the Sand (1999), which is about the "Mermaid Avenue" project, is included as a fourth disc.

Reception

On Metacritic, which assigns a normalized rating out of 100 to reviews from mainstream critics, the set has an average score of 85 based on 12 reviews, which indicates "universal acclaim". The A.V. Club gave it an A−.

Track listing

Disc 4: Man in the Sand (DVD)

Personnel
Billy Bragg – guitar, vocals
Jay Bennett – organ, bouzouki, clavinet, piano, drums, background vocals
Ken Coomer – percussion, drums
John Stirratt – piano, bass, background vocals
Jeff Tweedy – guitar, harmonica, vocals

Additional musicians
Eliza Carthy – violin
Bob Egan – slide guitar
Corey Harris – vocals, guitar, lap steel guitar
Ben Ivitsky – viola
Natalie Merchant – vocals
Peter Yanowitz – drums

See also
Mermaid Avenue (1998)
Man in the Sand (1999)
Mermaid Avenue Vol. II (2000)
Wonder Wheel (2006)
Woody Guthrie's Happy Joyous Hanukkah (2006)
The Works (Jonatha Brooke album) (2008)
New Multitudes (2012)

References

External links
Press release from Nonesuch Records
 

2012 compilation albums
Albums produced by Grant Showbiz
Billy Bragg compilation albums
Folk revival albums
Nonesuch Records compilation albums
Record Store Day releases
Wilco compilation albums
Woody Guthrie tribute albums
Albums produced by Jeff Tweedy